Mzala Nxumalo (27 October 1955, in Dundee, KwaZulu-Natal – 22 February 1991, in London), was a South African intellectual and anti-apartheid activist.

Life

Nxumalo was schooled in Louwsburg and then Bethal College in Butterworth and matriculated in KwaDlangezwa in Empangeni. He then studied at the University of Zululand after which he went into exile where he became a full time political activists living in Swaziland, Mozambique, Tanzania, Angola and the United Kingdom. He died in London.

Political activism

Nxumalo was expelled from two schools for political activism, and was detained without trial at the age of 15 after organising a school boycott. He joined the South African Students Organisation at university. After the Soweto uprising in 1976 he had to flee the country and he joined the African National Congress, uMkhonto we Sizwe and the South African Communist Party in exile. He worked as an underground operative and military leader and became a major intellectual in the anti-apartheid movement.

Writing

Mzala wrote numerous articles in journals like African Communist, Sechaba and Dawn, often using pseudonyms. His best known article was titled 'Cooking the Rice in the Pot'. In 1988 he published a book, Gatsha Buthelezi: chief with a double agenda, with Zed Books in London. Mangosuthu Buthelezi repeatedly tried to have the book removed from circulation.

Personal life

Nxumalo was married to Mpho Nxumalo, and they had two children, Zwide and Balindelwe.

See also
 African Communist
 Mangosuthu Buthelezi
 uMkhonto we Sizwe
 South African Communist Party

References

1955 births
1991 deaths
Marxist writers
Members of the Order of Luthuli
personnel
South African activists
South African communists
South African revolutionaries